James Chua (born 30 March 1979) is a Malaysian former badminton player. Born in Sarawak, Chua moved to Kuala Lumpur to join the BAM squad in 1995. He was part of the Malaysia junior team that won the boys' team bronze at the 1997 Asian Junior Championships in Manila. He was the champion at the 1998 Malaysia Satellite, and in 2001 clinched the National Championships title. Chua won the World Grand Prix title at the 2002 Malaysia Open defeated his compatriot the defending champion, Ong Ewe Hock in straight games. Together with the national men's team, they won the bronze medals at the 1998 and 2002 Asian Games.

Achievements

IBF World Grand Prix
The World Badminton Grand Prix sanctioned by International Badminton Federation (IBF) since 1983.

Men's singles

BWF International Challenge/Series 
Men's singles

References

External links
 
 

1979 births
Living people
People from Kuching
Malaysian sportspeople of Chinese descent
Malaysian male badminton players
Badminton players at the 2002 Asian Games
Badminton players at the 1998 Asian Games
Asian Games bronze medalists for Malaysia
Asian Games medalists in badminton
Medalists at the 1998 Asian Games
Medalists at the 2002 Asian Games